Gershom Gustav Schocken (29 September 1912 20 December 1990) was an Israeli journalist and politician who was editor of Haaretz for more than 50 years and a member of the Knesset for the Progressive Party between 1955 and 1959.

Biography
Gustav (Gershom) Schocken was born in Zwickau, Germany, to Zerline "Lilli" ( Ehrmann) and Salman Schocken, a retailer. He studied at the University of Heidelberg and the London School of Economics. While in Heidelberg, he befriended fellow student Walter Gross, whom he would later work with for decades at Haaretz. Following Adolf Hitler's rise to power, he made aliyah to Mandatory Palestine in 1933 one year before the rest of his family, and got a job at Anglo-Palestine Bank, where he remained until 1936.

Schocken was married to Shulamit Parsitz, daughter of General Zionists MK Shoshana Parsitz, and had three children, Amos (the current publisher of Haaretz), Hillel (an architect) and Racheli Edelman.

He died of liver cancer at the Sheba Medical Center in Tel Aviv on 20 December 1990 at the age of 78.

Media and literary career
In 1939 he became editor of the Haaretz newspaper, which had been bought by his father Salman two years earlier. He remained editor of the paper until his death in 1990. In 1950 he was amongst the founders of the ITIM news agency.

Schocken also published poetry in German, English and Hebrew under the penname Robert Pozen, as well as publishing a book, Poems for Times of Celebration in 1969. In 1983 he was named International Editor of the Year Award by the World Press Review for Haaretz's "excellence in coverage of Israel's invasion of Lebanon in 1982".

He often signed his articles using the pseudonym "Ben-Dam," literally "Son of Blood."

Political career
In 1955 he was elected to the Knesset on the Progressive Party list, and served on the House Committee, the Economic Affairs Committee and the Labor Committee. He quit politics and lost his seat in the 1959 elections.

References

External links

1912 births
1990 deaths
Jewish emigrants from Nazi Germany to Mandatory Palestine
People from Zwickau
Heidelberg University alumni
Alumni of the London School of Economics
Israeli bankers
Israeli journalists
Israeli poets
Israeli publishers (people)
Members of the 3rd Knesset (1955–1959)
Yishuv journalists
Progressive Party (Israel) politicians
20th-century poets
Burials at Nahalat Yitzhak Cemetery
20th-century journalists